European Universities Beach Volleyball Championships were the first organised in 2004. Apart from 2014, they have been organized annually.

The European Universities Beach Volleyball Championships are coordinated by the European University Sports Association along with the 18 other sports on the program of the European universities championships.

Overview

External links 
 EUSA official website

References

European Beach Volleyball Championships
beach volleyball
Beach volleyball competitions